Äntligen På Väg is the seventh studio album from Swedish singer/songwriter Ted Gärdestad, issued on the Polar Music label in 1994, his first full-length release since 1981's Stormvarning. Äntligen På Väg which was produced by his longtime friend Janne Schaffer and Leif Larsson and included the comeback hits "Ge En Sol", "Hon Är Kvinnan", "I Min Radio" and "Om Du Ville Ha Mig". The album became his last before his passing.

Track listing

Personnel
 Ted Gärdestad - lead vocals, piano
 Janne Schaffer - guitars, electric sitar
 Staffan Astner - guitars
 Lasse Englund - guitars
 Leif Larsson - synthesizer, keyboards
 Peter Ljung - synthesizer, organ, piano
 Backa Hans Ericsson - bass guitar
 Svante Henryson - bass guitar
 Johan Granström - bass guitar
 Per Lindvall - drums, percussion
 Mats Persson - drums, percussion
 Björn J:son Lindh - piano
 Per "Ruskträsk" Johansson - alto saxophone
 David Wilczewski - tenor saxophone
 Hans Arktoft - baritone saxophone
 Leif Lindvall - trumpet
 Lennart Wijk - trumpet
 Olle Holmqvist - trombone
 Marie Bergman - vocals
 Sös Fenger - backing vocals
 Gladys del Pilar - backing vocals
 Cai Högberg - backing vocals
 Magnus Rongedal - backing vocals
 Henrik Rongedal - backing vocals

Production
 Janne Schaffer - producer
 Leif Larsson - producer
 Björn J:son Lindh - string arrangements
 Peter Ljung - string and brass arrangements
 Recorded at Polar Studios and Europa Studios, Stockholm
 Lennart Östlund - sound engineer
 Leif Allansson - sound engineer

Charts

References

Sources and external links 
 Official home page, The Ted Gärdestad Society
 Liner notes Äntligen På Väg, Ted Gärdestad, Polar Music/PolyGram 523 835-2, 1994 
 [ Allmusic.com entry, Äntligen På Väg, Ted Gärdestad, 1994]

1994 albums
Ted Gärdestad albums